Robert Costanza (born September 14, 1950) is an American/Australian ecological economist and Professor at the Institute for Global Prosperity, University College London. He is a Fellow of the Academy of the Social Sciences in Australia and a Full Member of the Club of Rome.

Biography 
Before joining University College London, he was a professor at the Crawford School of Public Policy at The Australian National University in 2013 he was a professor at Portland State University in Oregon from 2010 to 2012. Costanza was the Gund Professor of Ecological Economics and director of the Gund Institute for Ecological Economics at the University of Vermont. Prior to moving to Vermont in August 2002, Costanza was director of the University of Maryland Institute for Ecological Economics, and a professor at University of Maryland's Center for Estuarine and Environmental Science, at Chesapeake Biological Lab on Solomons Island MD.

He is co-founder and past-president of the International Society for Ecological Economics and he was founding chief editor of the society's journal, Ecological Economics from its inception in 1989 until 2002. Costanza is the founding editor-in-chief of Solutions a hybrid popular/academic journal/magazine.  He currently serves on the editorial board of eight other international academic journals and is past president of the International Society for Ecosystem Health. He is a senior fellow at the Stockholm Resilience Centre, Stockholm, Sweden;  Affiliate Fellow at the Gund Institute for Environment at the University of Vermont; and a co-chair of the Ecosystem Services Partnership.

Selected literature

Studies
 2016, Modelling and measuring sustainable wellbeing in connection with the UN Sustainable Development Goals

Books
 2020, with John D. Erickson, Joshua Farley, and Ida Kubiszewski Sustainable Wellbeing Futures: a research and action agenda for Ecological Economics.
 2014, with John Cumberland, Herman Daly, Robert Goodland, Richard B. Norgaard, Ida Kubiszewski, and Carol Franco. An Introduction to Ecological Economics, Second Edition. 
 2014, with Ida Kubiszewski (eds). Creating A Sustainable and Desirable Future: Insights from 45 Global Thought Leaders.
 2013, with Gar Alperovitz, Herman Daly, Joshua Farley, Carol Franco, Tim Jackson, Ida Kubiszewski, Juliet Schor, and Peter Victor. Building a Sustainable and Desirable Economy-in-Society-in-Nature.
 2007, with Lisa Graumlich and Will Steffen, Sustainability or Collapse? An Integrated History and Future of People on Earth.
 2000, with Tom Prugh and Herman Daly, The local politics of global sustainability.
 1997, with John Cumberland, Herman Daly, Robert Goodland and Richard Norgaard, An Introduction to Ecological Economics
 1996, with Olman Segura and Juan Martinez-Alier, Getting down to earth: practical applications of ecological economics
 1992, with Bryan Norton and Ben Haskell, Ecosystem health: new goals for environmental management.
 1991, Ecological economics: The science and management of sustainability.

Most prominent articles
 1996, Costanza, R. Ecological economics: reintegrating the study of humans and nature. Ecological Applications 6:978-990 (1996)
 1997, Costanza et al. The value of the world's ecosystem services and natural capital. Nature 387:253-260 (1997)
 1998, Costanza et al. Principles for sustainable governance of the oceans. Science 281:198-199 (1998)
 2008, Costanza, R. Stewardship for a “Full” World. Current History  (January 2008) An excellent six-page (including a concise chart) exposition of ecological economics.
 2010, Costanza et al. The perfect spill: solutions for averting the next Deepwater Horizon, The Solutions Journal
 2014, Costanza et al. Changes in the global value of ecosystem services, Global Environmental Change
 2016, Costanza et al. Modelling and measuring sustainable wellbeing in connection with the UN Sustainable Development Goals, Ecological Economics
 2017, Costanza et al. Twenty years of ecosystem services: how far have we come and how far do we still need to go? Ecosystem Services
 2021, Costanza et al. Common asset trusts to effectively steward natural capital and ecosystem services at multiple scales, Journal of Environmental Management

See also 
 Club of Rome
 Balaton Group

References

External links 

 Media Release from ANU on Costanza's appointment
 Faculty page at ANU of Robert Costanza
 Curriculum vitae of Robert Costanza, 2019
Wellbeing Economy needs to be Primary Goal (2018, at the 50th Anniversary Meeting of the Club of Rome)

1950 births
21st-century American economists
Living people
Systems ecologists
American systems scientists
Sustainability advocates
University of Florida alumni
University of Vermont faculty
Renewable energy economy
Ecological economists
Academic journal editors
Academic staff of the Australian National University